Illya Putrya (born 15 May 1998) is a Ukrainian professional footballer who plays as a midfielder for Chornomorets Odesa.

Career
Putrya is a product of Azovstal Mariupol and Shakhtar Donetsk sportive school systems.

He made his début for FC Mariupol in the Ukrainian Premier League against FC Karpaty Lviv on 17 March 2019.

Personal life
His father, Herman Putrya, also was a professional footballer who played for FC Metalurh Zaporizhia, FC Zorya Luhansk and then FC Metalurh Mariupol.

References

External links
 

1998 births
Living people
People from Berdiansk
Ukrainian footballers
FC Mariupol players
FC Chornomorets Odesa players
Ukrainian Premier League players
Ukrainian First League players
Association football midfielders
Ukraine under-21 international footballers
Sportspeople from Zaporizhzhia Oblast